is a Japanese wrestler. He competed in the men's Greco-Roman 97 kg at the 1968 Summer Olympics.

References

External links
 

1943 births
Living people
Japanese male sport wrestlers
Olympic wrestlers of Japan
Wrestlers at the 1968 Summer Olympics
Sportspeople from Tokyo
20th-century Japanese people